Sieling is a surname. Notable people with the surname include:

Andreas Sieling (born 1964), German organist and musicologist
Carsten Sieling (born 1959), German politician
Charlotte Sieling (born 1960), Danish actress and film director